Aliou Badara Traoré (born 8 January 2001) is a French professional footballer who plays as a midfielder for Turkish club Göztepe.

Club career

Manchester United 
Traoré joined the Manchester United youth academy in 2017 and signed his first professional contract with the club on 9 January 2018, the day after his 17th birthday. He appeared for the club's under-21 side in the 2019–20 EFL Trophy, first as an unused substitute in the opening match against Rotherham United, before playing the full 90 minutes of matches against Lincoln City and Tranmere Rovers.

Caen (loan) 
On 17 August 2020, Traoré signed with Stade Malherbe Caen on a season-long loan. He made his debut for Caen in a goalless draw away to Clermont on the opening day of the 2020–21 Ligue 2 season on 22 August 2020, coming on as a 69th-minute substitute for Jessy Deminguet.

On 4 June 2021, Traoré was one of eight Manchester United players to be released following the 2020–21 season.

Parma 
On 8 September 2021, Traoré joined Parma.

Frosinone 
On 3 October 2022, Traoré signed a contract with Serie B club Frosinone until 30 June 2023.

Göztepe 
On 31 January 2023 he joined Turkish side Göztepe.

International career
Born in France, Traoré is of Malian descent. He is a youth international for France and has been capped at under-16 and under-19 levels.

References

External links

Profile at SMCaen.fr
Profile at Ligue2.fr

2001 births
People from Sarcelles
French people of Malian descent
Footballers from Val-d'Oise
Living people
French footballers
France youth international footballers
Association football midfielders
Manchester United F.C. players
Stade Malherbe Caen players
Parma Calcio 1913 players
Frosinone Calcio players
Göztepe S.K. footballers
Ligue 2 players
Serie B players
French expatriate footballers
French expatriate sportspeople in England
French expatriate sportspeople in Italy
French expatriate sportspeople in Turkey
Expatriate footballers in England
Expatriate footballers in Italy
Expatriate footballers in Turkey